Louis Vervaeke (born 6 October 1993 in Ronse) is a Belgian cyclist, who currently rides for UCI WorldTeam . In November 2021 Vervaeke announced that he would be joining  on a two-year deal from 2022, with a role as a climbing domestique for Remco Evenepoel in Grand Tours.

Major results

2011
 3rd Overall Grand Prix Rüebliland
2013
 4th Overall Tour des Pays de Savoie
 4th Overall Giro della Valle d'Aosta
2014
 1st  Overall Tour des Pays de Savoie
1st  Points classification
1st  Young rider classification
1st Stage 5
 1st  Overall Ronde de l'Isard
 5th Overall Tour de l'Avenir
1st Stage 7
 5th Circuit de Wallonie
 5th GP Maurice Raes
2015
 1st  Sprints classification, Tour of the Basque Country
2017
 2nd Trofeo Serra de Tramuntana
 4th Trofeo Pollenca–Port de Andratx
2020 
 8th Gran Trittico Lombardo
2021 
 1st  Mountains classification, Deutschland Tour
2022
 10th Overall Tour de la Provence
2023
 1st Stage 2 (TTT) UAE Tour
 2nd Trofeo Calvia

Grand Tour general classification results timeline

References

External links

1993 births
Living people
Belgian male cyclists
People from Ronse
Cyclists from East Flanders